Harry Mosé (born 1917; died before 2002) was a Brazilian rower. He competed in the men's coxed pair event at the 1952 Summer Olympics.

References

External links
 

1917 births
Year of death missing
Brazilian male rowers
Olympic rowers of Brazil
Rowers at the 1952 Summer Olympics
Place of birth missing